Josualdo Alves da Silva Oliveira (born 24 August 1978), commonly known as Kiko, is a former Brazilian professional footballer as a centre-back.

Career 

Prior to a 2007 arrival in Portugal, Kiko played majorly for modest clubs in native country. Other than a brief stint with Botafogo da Paraíba, he represented Associação Desportiva Cabense, Confancia FC, Unibol-PE, Sergipe FC, Campina Grande FC, Campinense Clube and Associação Atlética Coruripe.

References

External links 

  CBF
 Kiko at thefinalball.com
 Kiko profile at ForaDeJogo

1978 births
Living people
Sportspeople from Pernambuco
Brazilian footballers
Association football defenders
Associação Desportiva Confiança players
Club Sportivo Sergipe players
Campeonato Brasileiro Série A players
Botafogo Futebol Clube (PB) players
Treze Futebol Clube players
Campinense Clube players
Associação Atlética Coruripe players
Primeira Liga players
F.C. Paços de Ferreira players
Liga Portugal 2 players
Gil Vicente F.C. players
Grêmio Recreativo Serrano players
F.C. Arouca players
C.F. União players
Brazilian expatriate footballers
Expatriate footballers in Portugal
Brazilian expatriate sportspeople in Portugal